Pascal Greggory (born 8 September 1954) is a French actor.

Personal life
Greggory is openly gay. He had long-term relationships with Patrice Chéreau and François-Marie Banier.

Filmography
 Les Sœurs Brontë (1979) by André Téchiné
 Catherine de Heilbronn (1980, TV) by Éric Rohmer
 Le crime d'amour (1983) by Guy Gilles
 Pauline à la plage (1983) by Éric Rohmer
 Le trio en si bémol (1988, TV) by Éric Rohmer
 L'Arbre, le maire et la médiathèque (1993) by Éric Rohmer
 La Soif de l'or (1993) by Gérard Oury
 La Reine Margot (1994) by Patrice Chéreau
 La Rivière Espérance (1995, TV) by Josée Dayan
 Ceux qui m'aiment prendront le train (1998) by Patrice Chéreau
 Le Temps retrouvé (1999) by Raoul Ruiz
 The Messenger: The Story of Joan of Arc (1999) by Luc Besson
 La Confusion des Genres (2000) by Ilan Duran Cohen
 La Fidélité (2000) by Andrzej Żuławski
 La vie promise (2002) by Olivier Dahan
 Son frère (2003) by Patrice Chéreau (cameo)
 Arsène Lupin (2004) by Jean-Paul Salomé
 Gabrielle (2005) by Patrice Chéreau
 La Tourneuse De Pages (2006) by Denis Dercourt
 La Vie en Rose (2007) by Olivier Dahan
 La France (2008) by Serge Bozon
 Geliebte Clara (2008) by Helma Sanders-Brahms
 The Ball of the Actresses (2009) by Maïwenn
 Walled In (2009) by Gilles Paquet-Brenner
 Rebecca H. (Return to the Dogs) (2010)
 A Distant Neighborhood (2010) by Sam Garbarski
 Bye Bye Blondie (2012)
 Portrait of the Artist (2014)
 Tout de suite maintenant (2016)
 The Frozen Dead (2017, TV)
 Three Adventures Of Brooke (2018)
Frankie (2019)
 Our Lady of the Nile (2019)
 Irma Vep (2022, TV) by Olivier Assayas
 La Favorite (2023)
 One Fine Morning (TBA)

References

External links

1953 births
Living people
French male film actors
French male television actors
French gay actors
French male stage actors
Male actors from Paris
20th-century French male actors
21st-century French male actors